Pitchy Patchy is a Jamaican Jankunu festival figure. 

One of the original figures of Jamaican carnival, Pitchy Patchy is usually represented by a suit made of tattered, colorful pieces of cloth. Pitchy Patchy's role in the carnival is to keep masqueraders and the surrounding crowd in order by cracking a cattle whip.   According to Edward Long, the character originated from Akan festivals in celebration of John Canoe; the Ashanti commander became Pitchy patchy, wearing battledress with what would resemble charms, referred to as a "Batakari".

References 

Jamaican culture